Carlos Julián Ortíz Castillo (born December 4, 1974) is a retired male wrestler from Cuba, who competed in the freestyle competition during his career. He twice won a medal at the Pan American Games for his native country, and competed at the 2000 Summer Olympics in Sydney, Australia in the lightweight division. There he was eliminated in the final round by Armenia's Arshak Hayrapetyan.

Achievements
 1994 World Championship: 62.0 kg. Freestyle (11th)
 1995 Pan American Games: 62.0 kg. Freestyle (3rd)
 1997 World Championship: 63.0 kg. Freestyle (16th)
 1999 Pan American Games: 63.0 kg. Freestyle (2nd)
 1999 World Championship: 63.0 kg. Freestyle (23rd)
 2000 Summer Olympics: 63.0 kg. Freestyle (6th)
 2002 World Championship: 66.0 kg. Freestyle (20th)

References
 
 

1974 births
Living people
Olympic wrestlers of Cuba
Wrestlers at the 2000 Summer Olympics
Cuban male sport wrestlers
Wrestlers at the 1999 Pan American Games
Pan American Games silver medalists for Cuba
Pan American Games bronze medalists for Cuba
Pan American Games medalists in wrestling
Medalists at the 1999 Pan American Games
20th-century Cuban people
21st-century Cuban people